The Royal College of Nursing (RCN) is a registered trade union in the United Kingdom for those in the profession of nursing. It was founded in 1916, receiving its royal charter in 1928. Queen Elizabeth II was the patron until her death in 2022. The majority of members are registered nurses; however student nurses and healthcare assistants are also members. There is also a category of membership, at a reduced cost, for retired people.

The RCN describes its mission as representing nurses and nursing, promoting excellence in practice and shaping health policies. It has a network of stewards, safety representatives and union learning representatives as well as advice services for members. Services include a main library in London and regional libraries around the country. The RCN Institute also provides courses for nurses.

History
The College of Nursing Ltd was founded on 27 March 1916, with 34 members, as a professional organisation for trained nurses. on a proposal from Dame Sarah Swift and Sir Arthur Stanley Part of its objective was to set up a register of nurses. It was very explicitly not to be a trade union. It attempted an amalgamation with the Royal British Nurses' Association, but this was frustrated, largely by the efforts of Ethel Gordon Fenwick. In March 1917 the college had 2,553 members and, by 1919, 13,047, a great deal more than the RBNA. It had most of the nursing places on the General Nursing Council when it was first established, and by 1925 it had about 24,000 members. Membership was restricted to registered general nurses, thus excluding male nurses and those on the mental, mental subnormality, fever and children's registers.

A royal charter was granted in 1928 and the organisation became the College of Nursing and Frances Goodall became Assistant General Secretary. The college pushed for registered nurses to be given precedence, and to be in charge. In 1935 Frances Goodall became General Secretary and the Trades Union Congress promoted a bill to secure a 48-hour working week for all hospital employees. The college opposed this and was accused by the TUC of being "an organisation of voluntary snobs". In 1939 the college's name was changed to the Royal College of Nursing. The Ministry of Health guaranteed a salary of £40 to nursing students in training in 1941, about double what voluntary hospitals were paying before the war. The Royal College said that this was too high.

Since 1977 the RCN has been registered as a trade union.

21st century 
In 2018, after a pay agreement that was not clearly explained to the membership was agreed, the Chief Executive and General Secretary Janet Davies resigned and Dame Donna Kinnair was appointed in an acting capacity. She was confirmed in the role in April 2019. A motion of no confidence in the RCN Council was called shortly afterwards and passed in September 2018 with 78% of members' votes, but only 3.7% of the membership voted. As well as the Chief Executive and General Secretary, the Director of Member Relations had previously resigned. Twelve of the 17 council members resigned, ten of them standing for re-election in the subsequent election.

In 2019, the RCN's first strike—limited to Northern Ireland, over staffing and pay issues—took place.

In May 2019, the Royal College of Nursing voted to back the decriminalisation of prostitution.

In April 2021, Pat Cullen started acting as General Secretary & Chief Executive, and was appointed as interim General Secretary & Chief Executive in July 2021.

In August 2021, the RCN cancelled its annual meeting of members in Liverpool following allegations of sexual harassment and said the 2021 Congress would now be held virtually in order to safeguard attendees.

In 2022, the RCN issued a strike ballot over pay, held separately across NHS trusts and boards. Its members have gone on strike as part of the 2022–2023 National Health Service strikes. The RCN commented that from 2010 (the start of the government's austerity programme) to 2022, pay for nurses had fallen by 20 percent. The government offered a five percent pay rise to most Agenda for Change thresholds; the RCN demanded a pay rise of retail price index inflation plus five percent. Around 60 percent of NHS workplaces in England reached the turnout necessary to legally strike. Outside of Scotland—where the government began negotiations over its 7.5 percent offer—strikes took place on 15 December and 20 December 2022. In England, further strikes took place from 18–19 January 2023. In England and Wales, the next strikes are set to occur from 6–7 February 2023.

Offices

The headquarters are at 20 Cavendish Square, London, a Grade II listed building

RCN libraries

The RCN Library claims to be Europe's largest nursing-specific collection.

The RCN's Library in London, which is now known as the UK Library, was founded in 1921, and its contents include 60,000 volumes, 500 videos and 400 current periodicals on nursing and related subjects. The catalogue, with information on over 600m records, is now online.

Due to its historical holdings, the Library is a member of The London Museums of Health & Medicine group. Special collections include the Historical Collection and the RCN Steinberg Collection of Nursing Research, the latter of which comprises over 1,000 nursing theses and dissertations. Set up in 1974, the RCN Steinberg Collection of Nursing Research contains a selection of influential nursing theses and dissertations from the early 1950s to the present day.

Fellowships

Fellowships are selectively awarded by the RCN in recognition of exceptional contributions to nursing. Honorary fellowships are granted by the RCN Council to those who are unable to become an RCN member, either because they are from overseas or because they work outside the nursing profession. Only a small number of Fellows are elected each year. For example, in 2021, 11 fellows and two honourary fellows were elected, and in 2022, five fellows and three honourary fellows were elected.

Fellows and honorary fellows are entitled to the postnominal FRCN.

RCN Publications
RCN Publishing (branded as RCNi since March 2015) produces RCN Bulletin, a monthly member publication, and Nursing Standard, which is available through subscription and on news stands. It also publishes a range of journals for specialist nurses: Cancer Nursing Practice, Emergency Nurse, Learning Disability Practice, Mental Health Practice, Nursing Children and Young People, Nursing Management, Nursing Older People, Nurse Researcher, and Primary Health Care.

References

Further reading
 
 
 National Network of Learning Disability Nursing

External links

 

 
1916 establishments in the United Kingdom
Grade II listed buildings in the City of Westminster
Health in the City of Westminster
Medical museums in London
Organisations based in the City of Westminster
Royal colleges
Trade unions established in 1916